Modeste Gnakpa (born October 17, 1988 in Abidjan), is a French-Ivorian footballer.

Career
Gnakpa began his career with Aubagne F.C. and joined than in summer 2004 to the reserve of AJ Auxerre. He left after five years AJ Auxerre and signed for AD Ceuta in summer 2009. In July 2013 he signed for KRC Mechelen in the 3rd division (3A) of the Belgian football league.

Privates
Modeste is the cousin of Claude Gnakpa, who plays for Luton Town in England.

References

External links
 Skynet
 Modeste Gnakpa joueur de AUXERRE Association Jeunesse Auxerroise

1988 births
Living people
French footballers
AJ Auxerre players
Ligue 1 players
Ivorian footballers
Footballers from Abidjan
UR La Louvière Centre players
K.R.C. Mechelen players
Challenger Pro League players
Association football defenders